Begoña is a station on Line 10 of the Madrid Metro. It is located in fare Zone A. It lies directly below the major road Paseo de la Castellana which separates the districts of Fuencarral-El Pardo (La Paz neighbourhood) to the west and Chamartín to the east, though access is only via the west side of the road (a pedestrian subway access allows access to the station from the east).

Despite giving service to the Cuatro Torres Business Area and two large hospitals—La Paz and Ramón y Cajal—the station continues to have no disabled access as of 2020. This has caused much discontent with its frequent users, although there are plans for the construction of new elevator shafts.

References 

Line 10 (Madrid Metro) stations
Railway stations in Spain opened in 1982
Buildings and structures in Fuencarral-El Pardo District, Madrid